Chronister is a ghost town located in Cherokee County, Texas. The town is located north of Forest.

History 
Chronister was named for C. J. Chronister, a local lumber mill owner, with the community being built around his mill c1890s. By 1910 the community was incorporated into nearby Wildhurst.

References 

Geography of Cherokee County, Texas
Ghost towns in East Texas